Colin Hughes may refer to:

 Colin Hughes (microbiologist) (born 1953)
 Colin Hughes (1930-2017), Bahamian-born British-Australian political scientist